Simaetha is a genus of Australasian jumping spiders that was first described by Tamerlan Thorell in 1881. They resemble members of Simaethula and Stertinius.

Species
, it contains 23 species, found only in Asia, Papua New Guinea, and Australia:
Simaetha almadenensis Zabka, 1994 – Australia (Queensland, New South Wales)
Simaetha atypica Zabka, 1994 – Australia (Northern Territory)
Simaetha broomei Zabka, 1994 – Australia (Western Australia)
Simaetha cheni (Wang & Li, 2021) – China
Simaetha cingulata (Karsch, 1892) – Sri Lanka
Simaetha colemani Zabka, 1994 – Australia (Queensland)
Simaetha damongpalaya Barrion & Litsinger, 1995 – Philippines
Simaetha deelemanae Zhang, Song & Li, 2003 – Singapore
Simaetha furiosa (Hogg, 1919) – Indonesia (Sumatra)
Simaetha gongi Peng, Gong & Kim, 2000 – China
Simaetha huigang (Wang & Li, 2022) – China
Simaetha knowlesi Zabka, 1994 – New Guinea, Australia (Western Australia)
Simaetha laminata (Karsch, 1892) – Sri Lanka
Simaetha makinanga Barrion & Litsinger, 1995 – Philippines
Simaetha menglun (Wang & Li, 2020) – China
Simaetha paetula (Keyserling, 1882) – New Guinea, Australia (Western Australia, Queensland)
Simaetha papuana Zabka, 1994 – New Guinea
Simaetha pengi (Wang & Li, 2020) – China
Simaetha reducta (Karsch, 1892) – Sri Lanka
Simaetha robustior (Keyserling, 1882) – New Guinea, Australia (Queensland)
Simaetha tenuidens (Keyserling, 1882) – New Guinea, Australia (Queensland)
Simaetha tenuior (Keyserling, 1882) – New Guinea, Australia (Western Australia, Queensland)
Simaetha thoracica Thorell, 1881 (type) – Australia (Western Australia, Queensland)

Irura bidenticulata was initially mistaken by taxonomists for a species belonging to this genus.

References

External links
 Photograph of S. paetula
 Photographs of S. thoracica

Salticidae
Salticidae genera
Spiders of Asia
Spiders of Australia
Taxa named by Tamerlan Thorell